Braquo is a French crime drama television series created by Olivier Marchal. It was produced by Capa Drama with the participation of Canal+ in association with Marathon Group, Be-Films and RTBF. Braquo was first broadcast in France from 12 October to 2 November 2009.

The first season of Braquo established a record audience for an original production of the channel and surpassed that of many U.S. productions broadcast by the network. The second season started on Canal+ on 21 November 2011. A third and apparently final season was announced by lead actor Jean-Hugues Anglade in 2011. The ending of the third season, with two plot strands left unfinished, suggested a possible return. The series was available in the US from Hulu as of September 2013.

The fourth - and final - season of Braquo was shot between February and June 2015 in Marseille and Paris. It is directed by Xavier Palud and Frédéric Jardin and written by Abdel Raouf Dafri. It screened in France in September 2016, closely followed by a Spanish broadcast and began airing in the UK in November on FOX UK.

The name of the series comes from the French word braquage, meaning armed robberies, particularly of banks.

Plot
The protagonists are four police agents in the Hauts-de-Seine area of Paris: Eddy Caplan (Jean-Hugues Anglade), Walter Morlighem (Joseph Malerba), Théo Vachewski (Nicolas Duvauchelle) and Roxanne Delgado (Karole Rocher). Their colleague Max Rossi (Olivier Rabourdin) is accused of criminal misconduct, and commits suicide. His guilt is then presumed, disrupting the lives of the other four.

The four police agents then decide to "cross the yellow line": do whatever is necessary, even breaking the law, to clear Rossi's name. In crossing the yellow line, however, they fall under the close scrutiny of Vogel, of the police internal affairs bureau, a sworn enemy of Caplan.

Cast 

The main cast of Braquo is made up of the following:

 Jean-Hugues Anglade as Eddy Caplan (Series 1-4)
 Joseph Malerba as Walter Malerba (Series 1-4)
 Karole Rocher as Roxane Delgado (Series 1-4)
 Nicolas Duvauchelle as Théo Vachewski (Series 1-2, recurring role in series 3)
 Geoffroy Thiébaut as Roland Vogel (Recurring role throughout series 1-4)

Episodes

See also
 List of French television series

References

External links
Braquo at myCanal

2000s French drama television series
2010s French drama television series
2009 French television series debuts
French police procedural television series
Television shows set in France
International Emmy Award for Best Drama Series winners
Television shows set in Paris
Canal+ original programming
2016 French television series endings